Ghost Dance is the third studio album by The Pine Hill Haints. It was released in 2007 on K Records.

Track listing

Side A
"Spirit of 1812" (Jamie) – 2:14
"For Every Glass That's Empty" (Jamie) – 1:55
"I Never Thought the Day Would Come When You Could Hate Me So" (Jamie) – 2:07
"Say Something, Say Anything" (Jamie) - 1:34
"St. Louis Blues" (Traditional) - 3:12
"Phantom Rules" (Jamie) - 2:10
"When You Fall" (Jamie) - 2:04
"Death By Stereo" (Matt) - 1:28
"Garden of the Dead" (J.D. Crypt Kickers) - 2:10
"Whisper in the Dark" (Jamie) - 2:01

Side B
"You're Gonna Need Somebody on You're Bond" (Traditional) - 2:57
"Catfish Angels" (Jamie) - 2:45
"St. James Infirmary Blues" (Traditional) - 2:05
"Cuckoo Bird" (Traditional) - 2:18
"Columbus Stockade Blues" (Traditional) - 2:09
"Walkin' Talkin' Deadman" (Matt) - 2:31
"Ol' White Thang Blues" (Jamie) - 3:52
"Raggle Taggle Gypsy" (Traditional) - 1:53
"Leo O'Sullivan Blues" (from Cork Co. Ireland) - 0:55
"Wake Up" (Jamie) - 2:32

Personnel
The Pine Hill Haints are
Jamie Barrier - Guitar, Fiddle, Tenor Banjo
Katie Barrier - Washboard. Mandolin, Saw
Matt Bakula - Washtub Bass, Banjo
Ben Rhyne - Snare Drum, Snake Rattle
And
Mike Posey - accordion
Bradley Willams - Washtub Bass
Along With
Jeremy Dale Henderson - Snare Drum
Willie Jones - Bodhran
Natalia Beylis - Mandolin
Perrine Pericart - Flute
Dee Kirwin - Vocals
Danny Spurr - Banjo

References

2007 albums
The Pine Hill Haints albums
K Records albums